Sir Robert Howson Pickard FRS (27 September 1874 – 18 October 1949) was a chemist who did pioneering work in stereochemistry and also for the cotton industry in Lancashire. He was also involved in educational administration and was Vice Chancellor of the University of London from 1937-1939. He was Principal of Battersea Polytechnic (which later became the University of Surrey) from 1920 to 1927.

Early life

He was born in Balsall Heath, Birmingham, Warwickshire, (now the West Midlands), England, the son of Joseph Henry Pickard, a tool maker, and Alice his wife, the daughter of Robert Howson of Birmingham.<ref name ="JSTOR">[https://www.jstor.org/discover/10.2307/768791?uid=3738032&uid=2129&uid=2&uid=70&uid=4&sid=21101173480877 JSTOR - Obituary Notices of Fellows of the Royal Society, 1950, accessed 27 August 2012]</ref> From 1883-1891 he attended King Edward VI's Grammar School. In 1891 he studied chemistry at Mason Science College (which later became the University of Birmingham), under Percy F. Frankland and obtained a first class BSc, then awarded by the University of London. In 1896 he attended the University of Munich as an 1851 Exhibitioner being awarded a PhD summa cum laude'' in 1898.

Career
After a year in Birmingham doing chemical research, he was appointed head of the chemistry at Blackburn Technical School in Blackburn, Lancashire and was principal from 1908-1920. While at Blackburn was involved in publication of 35 papers in the Journal of the Chemical Society. He did original work on chemical structure and optical isomerism and as a result became a Fellow of the Royal Society (FRS) in 1917. Pickard was Principal of Battersea Polytechnic (which later became the University of Surrey) from 1920 to 1927. 

He was also consulted by the cotton industry and later became director of the British Cotton Industry Research Association (then the Shirley Institute) in Manchester from 1927-1943 and expanded the technical facilities extensively in 1936.

He had considerable organisational skills and was active in several scientific organisations including the Royal Society (council); Society of Chemical Industry (president 1932-33); the Royal Institute of Chemistry (now the Royal Society of Chemistry) (president 1936-1939); the Chemical Society (vice-president); the now defunct Chemical Council (chairman) and various positions over a long period with the University of London including Vice-Chancellor, 1937-1939.

Personal life
He married Ethel Marian Wood in 1901. She died in 1944. They had a daughter, who predeceased her father, and a son. He died at his son's home in Headley, Surrey.

See also
 List of Vice-Chancellors of the University of London
 List of British university chancellors and vice-chancellors

References

Vice-Chancellors of the University of London
English chemists
Fellows of the Royal Society
Alumni of University of London Worldwide
Alumni of the University of London
Alumni of the University of Birmingham
Ludwig Maximilian University of Munich alumni
1874 births
1949 deaths
Stereochemists